The Santa Cruz Valley Unified School District #35 (SCVUSD) is a school district based in Santa Cruz County, Arizona. The students enrolled in the district reside in Rio Rico, Tumacácori, Tubac and Amado.

Schools

High school
Rio Rico High School - RRHS home page

Middle schools
Calabasas K-8
Coatimundi MS

Elementary schools
Mountain View
San Cayetano

School districts in Santa Cruz County, Arizona